Jacob Bromwell may refer to:

 Jacob H. Bromwell (1848–1924), U.S. Representative from Ohio
 Jacob Bromwell (company), the oldest housewares company in the United States